Johannes Holt Iversen (born 8 September 1989) is a Danish painter and sculptor currently located in Amsterdam, Netherlands. 
He is an apprentice of Danish painter and sculptor Erik Rytter (former assistant of Poul Gernes).

Early career

Early work, 1999–2014

Johannes Holt Iversen started out his artistic career in the music industry, writing songs and performing on stage at age 9. In his teenage years he began as a singer/songwriter writing songs for sync. opportunities abroad in Asia and the United States under American representation. In 2012 he collaborated with American R&B/Soul artist and singer Omar Wilson featuring on the track "Dreamology" released in the US. In 2014 his single "Love Train" was in the bidding, co-writing for Korean K-pop sensation Super Junior. "Love Train" was produced by well-renowned J-pop producer Ryuichiro Yamaki (Namie Amuro, Airi Suzuki) and renowned producer Pete Maher (U2, Katy Perry, Depeche Mode). In 2014 he participated in the development and initiation of the Spotify Artists open data programme, using an artist pseudonyme on the streaming service.

Academy Years, 2016–2020

Johannes Holt Iversen was enrolled to the Dutch Academy of Fine Arts Gerrit Rietveld Academie in September 2016. Later in 2016 he participated in the Остен International Biennial of Drawing at the Остен Museum of Modern Art Skopje, Macedonia. In 2018 Johannes Holt Iversen exhibited at Glassbox Gallery in the 11th arrondissement of Paris, France as well as CHPEA Museum in Herning Denmark where he participated on the national Danish TV program series The Great Masterpiece Challenge on DR1, based on the concept by the British TV-network Sky Arts. Here he painted an exact replica of the famous CoBrA painting "Bird Eating" from 1939 by Carl-Henning Pedersen. In 2019 Johannes Holt Iversens works from his series Lascaux 1.0 beta was acquired for the Danish National Art Collection by the Danish Arts Council and the Danish Arts Foundation, furthermore he won the Italian-based Galleria Banditto Main Residency Art Price for his new findings in contemporary painting.

International Career, 2021

In April 2021 Johannes Holt Iversen became represented by Patricia Chicheportiche from Galerie 208 in Paris, France. In November 2021 he furthermore became represented by Elena Ioannidou from The Edit Gallery in Limassol, Cyprus. During December 2021 and January 2022, Johannes Holt Iversen in collaboration with Director of Fermentation Jason White of the highly acclaimed Noma (restaurant) created an artwork based on a Plexiglas construction using a combination of optical holographic PVC and grown mycelial hyphal mold, which is biologically slowed down by the Noma's lab equipment. The artwork now hangs in Noma (restaurant) in their Fermentation Lab. In April 2022 Johannes Holt Iversen was part of a group exhibition called "The Responsive Body" together with artist Sali Muller held by Stella Allery Berlin in Germany. In December 2022 Johannes Holt Iversen participated in his first group exhibition in South Asia held by Pakistan Art Forum curated by art advisor Zara Sajid.

See also
Art of Denmark
List of Danish painters

References 

University of Copenhagen / Gyldendal: Reception #74 - Tidsskrift for Nordisk Litteratur", Copenhagen 2015 . ISSN 1904-7088 in Danish
University of Copenhagen / Gyldendal: Reception #76 - Tidsskrift for Nordisk Litteratur", Copenhagen 2017 . ISSN 1904-7088 in Danish

External links
 Danmarks Radio DR1 in Danish
 ArtFacts.net Database of International Contemporary Art in English
 The international collection of OCTEH Museum of Art Macedonia in Macedonian
Official Website of Johannes Holt-Iversen in English

1989 births
21st-century Danish painters
Abstract painters
Danish sculptors
Danish male artists
Danish watercolourists
People from Copenhagen
Living people
Male sculptors